The 1983 San Diego State Aztecs football team represented San Diego State University during the 1983 NCAA Division I-A football season as a member of the Western Athletic Conference (WAC).

The team was led by head coach Doug Scovil, in his third year, and played home games at Jack Murphy Stadium in San Diego, California. They finished with a record of two wins, nine losses and one tie (2–9–1, 1–6–1 WAC). This was the fewest wins for an Aztec team since they only won one in 1960, and they finished the year with seven straight losses.

Wide receiver Jim Sandusky was named a third-team All-American by the Gannett News Service and Football News. He earned first-team All-WAC honors as both a receiver and a punt returner.

Schedule

Team players in the NFL
The following were selected in the 1984 NFL Draft.

The following finished their college career in 1983, were not drafted, but played in the NFL.

Team awards

Notes

References

San Diego State
San Diego State Aztecs football seasons
San Diego State Aztecs football